Lakum is a village in Shwegu Township in Bhamo District in the Kachin State of north-eastern Burma. In 1901 it had a population of 69, all of whom spoke the Kachin language and were illiterate in Kachin and animists.

References

External links
Satellite map at Maplandia.com

Populated places in Kachin State
Shwegu Township